Johann Heinrich Ernesti (12 March 1652 – 16 October 1729) was a Saxon philosopher, Lutheran theologian, Latin classicist and poet. He was rector of the Thomasschule, and Professor of Poetry at Leipzig University. He gained fame through his writings on Cicero.

Life 
Ernesti was born in Königsfeld, the son of the preacher Daniel Ernesti. He received his first lessons from his father, who was a Königsfeld rector. Later, he attended high school in Altenburg under his cousin Jacob Daniel Ernesti. From 1670, he studied theology and philosophy at the University of Leipzig, where he became Baccalaureus in 1672, and in 1674 Master of Philosophy.

In 1680 he was appointed as an assessor at the Faculty of Arts of the University. Furthermore, he worked until 1682 as a Saturday preacher at the Church of St. Nicholas. He was conrector (vice-principal) from 1680 and from 1684 to 1729 rector (principal) of the Thomasschule, succeeding Jacob Thomasius. He introduced a new education policy, including allowing school prayer in German.  He served for 45 years, the longest term of office of all known principals. His successor was the influential Johann Matthias Gesner.

From 1691 Ernesti was professor of poetry at the University of Leipzig. He taught about Roman poets Horace, Ovid, Juvenal and Virgil and also more recent Latin writers such as Helius Eobanus Hessus. Ernesti himself was active as a writer, his output included panegyrics. His most important work was 14 Selectarum Orationum Liber (Marcus Tullius Cicero).

When composer Johann Sebastian Bach applied for the post of cantor (choirmaster) in 1723, Ernesti was the rector of the school.

Ernesti died on 16 October 1729 in Leipzig.
For the memorial service for Ernesti's death held on 21 October 1729 in the Paulinerkirche, the university church, Bach composed the motet Der Geist hilft unser Schwachheit auf, BWV 226.

Works 
 Centuria evangeliorum ad usum scholasticum exactorum, 1687.
 De usu profanarum litterarum in interpretandis scripturis sacris, 1688.
 De usu sacrarum litterarum in interpretandis scriptoribus profanis, 1689.
 Dissert. acad. de pharisaeismis in libris profanorum scriptorum occurrentibus, 1690.
 De orationibus in libris N. T. historicis, 1692.
 De Regulo, 1694.
 Historiae rerum sacrarum et profanarum parallelae, 1694–96.
 Cornelius Nepos per epistolas scribens, 1698.
 Misnia Romana, 1698.
 Compendium hermoneuticae profanae s. de legendis scriptoribus profanis praecepta nonnulla, 1699.
 Commentatio, 1700.
 Orationes de professoribus oratoriis, 1702.
 De prof. ethicis, 1702.
 De professoribus poeticis, 1702.
 De prof. dialecticis et logicis, 1703.
 De sportula Romanorum quotidiana, 1703.
 ὈρνιθογραΦία Ovidiana, 1705.
 Commentationes novae in Cornelium Nepotem. Justinum, Terentium, Plautum, Curtium et poesim barbaricam, 1707/38.
 Commentatio in res philosophicas seculares, 1709.
 Paralipomena, 1711.
 Historia rerum Lipsicarum metrica, 1712.
 Observationes poeticae de genere carminum didactico et versu rhythmico, 1714.
 Usurpata a Curtio in particulis latinitas, 1719.
 De latente in fabulis poeticis divina veritate, 1722.
 Accedunt Praefatio et Indices. Bearbeitungen von Gottlob Benedikt von Schirach, Buchhandlung des Waisenhauses, Halle 1746.
 14 Selectarum Orationum Liber. Buchhandlung des Waisenhauses, Halle 1822.

References

Bibliography
 Leontsky, Jan. Bach against Ernesti, the strange quarrel. (Essay in French). Tarnhelm Ed. 2011.

External links 
 

German philosophers
German Lutheran theologians
17th-century German Protestant theologians
18th-century German Protestant theologians
German poets
1652 births
1729 deaths
Academic staff of Leipzig University
Leipzig University alumni
17th-century Latin-language writers
18th-century Latin-language writers
17th-century philosophers
18th-century philosophers
Lutheran philosophers
German male poets
17th-century German writers
18th-century German writers
German male non-fiction writers
18th-century German male writers
17th-century German male writers